Inolimomab is a mouse monoclonal antibody developed as an immunosuppressive drug against graft-versus-host disease. Its target is the alpha chain of the interleukin-2 receptor.

References

Monoclonal antibodies